The 120 members of the twelfth Knesset were elected on 1 November 1988. The breakdown by party was as follows:
Likud: 40
Alignment: 39
Shas: 6
Agudat Yisrael: 5
Ratz: 5
National Religious Party: 5
Hadash: 4
Tehiya: 3
Mapam: 3
Tzomet: 2
Moledet: 2
Shinui: 2
Degel HaTorah: 2
Progressive List for Peace: 1
Arab Democratic Party: 1

List of members

Replacements

External links
Members of the Twelfth Knesset Knesset website

 
12